Arthur Percy Spark (4 June 1894 – 29 August 1953) was a British athlete. He competed in the men's decathlon at the 1924 Summer Olympics. Later, he was Lord Mayor of Stoke-on-Trent between 1949 and 1950.

References

External links
 

1894 births
1953 deaths
Athletes (track and field) at the 1924 Summer Olympics
British decathletes
Olympic athletes of Great Britain
Olympic decathletes
Lord Mayors of Stoke-on-Trent